Twin Lakes Brewing Company is an American brewing company. Since August 2017, its brewery and taproom have been located in the Newport Industrial Park, in Newport, Delaware.

History 
The Twin Lakes Brewing Company was founded in Greenville, Delaware in April, 2006.  It moved to Newport, Delaware in 2015 and hopes to expand the business.

Products 

The Twin Lakes Brewing Company produces approximately 10,000 barrels of beer per year. Beers produced by Twin Lakes include Route 52 Pilsner, Greenville Pale Ale, Tweeds Tavern Stout, Winterthur Spring Wheat Ale, Jubilicous Holiday Ale, and Caesar Rodney Golden Ale. The names of these beers come from the rich history of the brewery and its surrounding area. The newest addition to the Twin Lakes family of beers is the Oktoberfest, which is being brewed in a very limited supply through the month of September. Twin Lakes beer is available throughout Delaware, and, starting on May 16, 2009, Pennsylvania. The brewery plans to expand sales into Maryland and New Jersey in the coming year or two as well.

Green energy

In its former location Twin Lakes installed 2-kilowatt solar energy panels.  In its current location in Newport, Delaware it hopes to manufacture delicious beer in a way that considers the impact on the environment.

References

External links
 Twin Lakes Brewing Company Official Website

Beer brewing companies based in Delaware
Companies based in New Castle County, Delaware
American companies established in 2006
2006 establishments in Delaware